46664 was a series of AIDS benefit concerts played in honour of Nelson Mandela by South African and foreign musicians between 2003 and 2008.

Origin
The second time that Mandela was imprisoned on Robben Island was in 1964, and he was the 466th prisoner that year. His prison number remained 466/64 until 1982, when he was transferred to Pollsmoor Prison and given the prison number 220/82.  "Prisoner 46664" continues to be used as a reverential title for him. Shortly before Joe Strummer's death, he and U2's Bono co-wrote the song "46664" for Mandela as part of the campaign against AIDS in Africa.

46664 concerts

Cape Town, South Africa
On 29 November 2003, an event called the 46664 Concert was held at Green Point Stadium, Cape Town.  It was hosted by Mandela and its goal was to raise awareness of the spread of HIV/AIDS in South Africa. The following artists performed:

Anastacia
Beyoncé Knowles
Bob Geldof
Queen (Brian May and Roger Taylor)
Paul Oakenfold with Shifty Shellshock and TC
 Amampondo Drummers
Baaba Maal
Youssou N'Dour
Angelique Kidjo
Bono and The Edge from U2
Abdel Wright
Chris Thompson, Zoe Nicholas, Treana Morris
Yvonne Chaka Chaka
Bongo Maffin
Johnny Clegg
Jimmy Cliff
The Corrs
Ladysmith Black Mambazo
Eurythmics
Danny K
Watershed
Zucchero
Ms. Dynamite
Andrew Bonsu
Soweto Gospel Choir

Following the concert, three live CDs and a DVD titled "46664: The Event" were released.

George, South Africa
On 19 March 2005, another "annual" 46664 Concert was held at Fancourt Country Club and Golfing Estate, in George, South Africa with people like Katie Melua, Prime Circle, Annie Lennox, Juluka with Johnny Clegg and Queen + Paul Rodgers.  Will Smith was the host.

Madrid, Spain
The first 46664 event to be staged in Europe took place from 29 April 2005 through to 1 May 2005 in Madrid, Spain. The concerts named "46664 Festival Madrid" focused on Spanish-speaking artists, as shown in the following list:

"Noche de Raices"
("Roots night", 29 April 2005)
Falete
Valderrama
Diana Navarro
José Mercé
Queco
La Tana
Diego El Cigala
Josemi Carmona
Pepe Habichuela
Pasión Vega
Alberto Cortez
Niña Pastori

"Noche de Pop"
("Pop night", 30 April 2005)
Taxi
No se lo digas a Mamá
Beatriz Luengo
Fábula
Modestia Aparte
Sybel
La sonrisa de Julia
El sueño de Morfeo
El Canto del Loco
Jarabe de Palo
Mikel Erentxun
Nacho García Vega
Miguel Ríos
Los Anónimos
Danza Invisible
Presuntos Implicados
Loquillo y Trogloditas
Iguana Tango
Pereza
Javier Gurruchaga

"Noche de Solistas"
("Singer-songwriter's night", 1 May 2005)
Elena Bujedo
Pedro Javier Hermosilla
Carmen Paris
Jorge Drexler
Carlos Núñez
Ismael Serrano
Manolo García
Sergio Dalma
Zucchero

Tromsø, Norway

On 11 June 2005, the 46664 Arctic Concert was held in Tromsø, Norway.
The following artists performed:

Anneli Drecker and Jane Kelly (NO)
Adjagas and Lawra Somby
Razorlight (UK)
Kaizers Orchestra (NO)
Bongo Maffin (ZA)
Samsaya (IND/NO)
Earth Affair (IS)
Noora Noor (NO)
Thomas Dybdahl (NO)
Saybia (DK)
Angelique Kidjo (DK)
Peter Gabriel (UK)
Robert Plant and Strange Sensation (UK)
Mafikizolo (ZA)
Madrugada (NO)
Ane Brun (NO)
Jivan Gasparyan
House band with:
Annie Lennox (UK)
Brian May (UK)
Sharon Corr (IRL)
Zucchero (ITA)
Sami
Johnny Clegg (UK/ZA)

Johannesburg, South Africa
On 1 December 2007, International World AIDS Day, a third concert was held in  Johannesburg, South Africa. The concert was hosted at Ellis Park, with tens of thousands of people in attendance. Peter Gabriel, Annie Lennox, Angelique Kidjo, Ludacris, Corinne Bailey Rae, Goo Goo Dolls, Razorlight, The Who, Prime Circle, Cassette and Jamelia performed for Nelson Mandela on stage. The event was streamed live on iclips.net. All technical services were supplied by the Gearhouse Group South Africa

London, United Kingdom

A concert celebrating Nelson Mandela's 90th birthday took place in London's Hyde Park on 27 June 2008.

Artists who performed at this special event included Jivan Gasparyan, Josh Groban, Zucchero, Queen + Paul Rodgers, Annie Lennox, Simple Minds, Jerry Dammers, Amy Winehouse, Amaral, The Who, Sugababes, Razorlight, Leona Lewis, Eddy Grant, Joan Baez and Jamelia. Will Smith opened the concert with his wife Jada Pinkett Smith. Smith later performed his song "Switch". Quincy Jones also made an appearance introducing Leona Lewis. Other celebrities who made an appearance include Lewis Hamilton, Geri Halliwell and Peter Gabriel.

Joining them were South African and African artists Johnny Clegg, Sipho Mabuse, Loyiso, Vusi Mahlasela, the Soweto Gospel Choir, AIDS orphan choir The Children of Agape (the subject of the award-winning film feature We Are Together), the legendary Papa Wemba, and Sudanese "war child" rapper Emmanuel Jal, among others.

A surprise guest, expected to be the Spice Girls, had been promised, but the girl group did not perform.  Dame Shirley Bassey had been confirmed as a guest, but did not appear on advice from her doctors, following recent stomach surgery.

The concert was broadcast live online at Iclips.net and on Virgin Radio, and highlights shown on ITV1 (and MHD in the United States), hosted by Phillip Schofield and Fearne Cotton.

See also
Nelson Mandela 70th Birthday Tribute
Nelson Mandela Day
Nelson Mandela Foundation

References

External links

Nelson Mandela Centre of Memory
Article about the initial concert

Nelson Mandela
Benefit concerts
HIV/AIDS in South Africa